Arrhythmia is a group of conditions in which the heartbeat is irregular, too fast, or too slow.

Arrhythmia may also refer to:

 Arrhythmia (film), a 2017 Russian drama film
 Arrhythmia (Antipop Consortium album), 2002
 Arrhythmia (Hail the Ghost album), 2019
 Arrhythmia (novel), a 2011 novel by Alice Zorn